William "Bill" Fleming Hoggan Jarrett, RCVS, FRCPath, FRCPG, FRS (1928–2011) was a British pathologist.

Personal life
Bill was born on 2 January 1928 in Glasgow.
He studied at Lenzie Academy, Glasgow, and Glasgow Veterinary College. His father, though a joiner and cabinetmaker, came from a farming background and moved his family shortly afterwards to an agricultural smallholding near Cumbernauld. Their early life there no doubt influenced Bill, his elder brother Tom and younger brother Oswald to study veterinary medicine. Bill graduated from Glasgow Veterinary College with honours in 1947 and then, already attracted to research, studied for a PhD, training in animal pathology at the College and in human pathology with Dan Cappell, Professor of Pathology at the Medical School. Consequently, he had a wide understanding of animal and human diseases which laid the foundation for his future research in comparative medicine.

He taught at the University of Glasgow.
In 1952 Bill married Anna Sharp, then a Lecturer at the Glasgow and West of Scotland College of Domestic Science. They eventually established a home in the countryside north of Glasgow that became a welcoming focus of generous hospitality for their family and huge circle of close friends, embracing a wide range of talented people from all walks of life and nationalities. Bill and Anna had known each other since their school days at Lenzie Academy when they had developed a passion for the Scottish countryside, especially the mountains. Over the years they engaged in sports that carried a certain frisson: mountaineering, skiing, motor rallying and particularly sailing, on the west coast of Scotland, France and Mallorca. At the same time Bill was a talented musician (he played trumpet, guitar and sang with a Scots and jazz bent), passionate about politics, a voracious reader and bon viveur (malt whiskies, and oysters at the Oyster Bar of the Grand Central Station in New York among his favourites).

He died on 27 August 2011. He is succeeded by his daughters Freda and Ruth, both distinguished medical graduates, Freda’s children Amanda and Hamish, and his brother Oswald.

Research
In 1964, he discovered the retrovirus that causes leukemia and lymphoma in cats. During diagnostic pathology work at Garscube, Bill noted a very much higher prevalence of lymphoma in cats than in man. When a local veterinary practitioner drew to his attention to a household of cats in which a large number of cases had occurred in a short period of time, Bill considered that the reason might be that the disease was infectious, like the condition in domestic poultry and laboratory mice. He set up transmission experiments in cats using material from one of these cases. In 1963, after an incubation period of over a year, the disease was transmitted and a virus was demonstrated in the resulting tumours. This was subsequently shown to be a novel retrovirus, feline leukaemia virus (FeLV).

The discovery of FeLV immediately provoked great interest in the field of oncology, coming at a time in the early 1960s when viruses were becoming seriously considered as causes of cancer in man. It was described as ‘Exhibit A’ in an application to the US Congress by the NCI for substantial funding to set up the Special Virus Cancer Program in 1968, which established an infrastructure for subsequent virus hunting in human cancers. Subsequently the most direct impact of FeLV on human medicine was the influence of Bill’s work on his friend Robert Gallo at NCI. Gallo was persuaded to explore human T-cell leukaemias for viruses after Bill found that most lymphomas caused by FeLV in cats were of T-lymphocyte origin.  He established a way to grow T-cells in long-term culture from which came his discovery of the first human retrovirus, human T-lymphotropic virus (HTLV-1), and later human immunodeficiency virus (HIV).

With substantial funding from cancer charities, Bill then recruited a team which investigated the biology of FeLV in depth, together with collaborators throughout the world. The virus was shown to be a common infection of cats, particularly affecting animals kept in groups, in which the virus was transmitted very efficiently. Many animals recovered from the infection but some became persistently infected and had a very high risk of developing leukaemia or lymphoma. Diagnostic tests were developed which identified infected animals. By isolating these cats, spread of the virus could be halted. Bill also showed that vaccination was possible and the group collaborated with pharmaceutical companies in the development of a variety of commercial vaccines. The application of these methods of control has resulted in FeLV infection now being uncommon in many countries and has made a profound improvement to cat welfare.

A valuable collaboration of Bill’s group with Jim Neil (FRSE) and his molecular biological colleagues at the Beatson Institute for Cancer Research on University of Glasgow's Garscube campus provided an opportunity to define the molecular events in the pathogenesis of lymphoma by FeLV. They discovered that the virus activated cellular oncogenes by several mechanisms of insertional mutagenesis. When Jim subsequently moved his group to the Veterinary School and established a Laboratory of Molecular Oncology, he began to use this device in other systems to identify novel oncogenes. He also became involved in defining the molecular events that caused other FeLV-related disease. Bill’s detailed pathological studies of haematopoietic disease in the cat showed that FeLV caused several types of anaemia as well as leukaemia and lymphoma. FeLV subtypes were recognised that caused pure red cell aplasia (PRCA) and the group showed these viruses to be mutants of the common form of the virus, which blocked the production of red blood cell at a specific stage of differentiation.

Another offshoot of the expertise generated by FeLV research was the creation of the Leukaemia Research Fund Human Virus Centre with the remit to discover viruses as causes of human leukaemia and lymphoma. The first director was David Onions (FRSE) who had been involved in defining the pathogenesis of PRCA in cats.  The director is currently Bill’s daughter, Ruth, a graduate in medicine who had been a postgraduate scientist with Robert Gallo.

In 1968 Bill was appointed Professor of Veterinary Pathology at Glasgow and attracted substantial funding for new research laboratories. In the 1970s and 1980s, following observations in the 1960s of papillomas in association with clusters of vulvo-cutaneous carcinomas in Friesian cattle in the Highlands of Kenya, with Max Murray (FRSE), he investigated the reasons for a high incidence of alimentary tract carcinoma in cattle in parts of Scotland.  Through a large abattoir survey, he showed that papillomas were more common and occurred in greater numbers in animals of all ages on the cancer farms compared to lowland cattle, and that they were caused by a novel virus, bovine papillomavirus type 4 (BPV-4). In older cattle, he noted that cancers could develop from existing papillomas and proposed that immunosuppressants and carcinogens in bracken were responsible for this malignant progression. At this time he established a productive collaboration with Saveria Campo (FRSE) of the Beatson Institute. With Bill, she and her colleagues investigated in detail the biology of bovine papillomaviruses, especially BPV-1, -2 and -4, and developed recombinant vaccines of BPV-4 proteins that protected cattle from developing papillomas when challenged, and indeed could slow the growth of existing tumours. These results laid the conceptual framework for the production of vaccines against the subtypes of human papillomaviruses that cause cervical cancer in women, which are now offered routinely to young women in many countries.

After the co-discovery of HIV by Robert Gallo and Luc Montagnier, Bill renewed his association with Gallo and in the late 1980s worked with him in Washington as a Fogarty Scholar on the nascent field of HIV vaccine research.  Bill was one of a group of eminent scientists who successfully made the case to the Thatcher government that this novel disease was so important that it required new investment in research despite public expenditure cuts. Consequently, he became a founder member of the AIDS Directed Programme of the MRC. With colleagues in Glasgow, particularly Jim Neil and his brother Oswald, he established a research group that exploited another newly discovered retrovirus, feline immunodeficiency virus, as a model for HIV vaccination. Perhaps the most telling achievement of the group was determining the constraints that apply to vaccination with this type of retrovirus: in particular, the discovery that certain prototypic vaccines enhanced the virus infection rather than protecting against it. Unfortunately this outcome was confirmed subsequently by trials of a HIV vaccine. Work on both FeLV and FIV continues at the School in the Retrovirus Research Laboratory.

He was made a Fellow the Royal Society of Edinburgh in 1965 and awarded the Makdougall-Brisbane Prize 1980-82, and was made a Fellow of the Royal Society in 1980. Bill’s family have had a remarkable association with the Society. His uncle, broadcaster Harry Hoggan, brother Oswald, and daughter Ruth were all elected Fellows in following years.

References

1928 births
2011 deaths
British pathologists
Scientists from Glasgow
Alumni of the University of Glasgow
Fellows of the Royal Society
Fellows of the Royal Society of Edinburgh